Adalhard of Babenberg (died 903) was a member of the Frankish house of Babenberg. He was the son of Margrave Henry I of Babenberg and Judith of Friuli.
During the Babenberg feud, he was arrested by the Conradine leaders in 902 and executed at the Reichstag of Forchheim in 903.

Babenberg
903 deaths
Year of birth unknown